Seth G. Jones is an academic, political scientist and author. Jones is most renowned for his work on counterinsurgency and counterterrorism; much of his published material and media presence relates to US strategy in Afghanistan and Pakistan, and in confronting al-Qāʿida. He is currently a Fellow and Director at the Center for Strategic and International Studies (CSIS).

Biography 

Seth G. Jones holds the Harold Brown Chair, is director of the Transnational Threats Project, and is a senior adviser to the International Security Program at the Center for Strategic and International Studies (CSIS) in Washington, D.C. Prior to joining CSIS, Dr. Jones was the director of the International Security and Defense Policy Center, and senior political scientist at the RAND Corporation, where he worked from 2003 to 2017.

He served as the representative for the commander, U.S. Special Operations Command, to the Assistant Secretary of Defense for Special Operations in 2010, and in 2011, as a plans officer and advisor to the commanding general, U.S. Special Operations Forces, in Afghanistan (Combined Forces Special Operations Component Command–Afghanistan).

From 2002-2009, he was Adjunct Professor, Security Studies Program, Edmund A. Walsh School of Foreign Service, Georgetown University, where he taught classes on "Counterinsurgency" and "Stability Operations." He has also served as Adjunct Professor, Center for Homeland Defense and Security, United States Naval Postgraduate School, since 2005.

Jones attracted considerable attention for his historical analysis of Afghanistan and Pakistan in his book In the Graveyard of Empires: America's War in Afghanistan. The book examines the collapse of the Zahir Shah regime, the rise of the anti-Soviet war, the Afghan civil war in the early 1990s, the Taliban take-over of much of the country in the late 1990s, the U.S-led overthrow of the Taliban regime in 2001, and the subsequent insurgency.

Jones also received considerable attention for his work with Ambassador James Dobbins on nation-building. Their RAND book America's Role in Nation-Building, which examined the U.S. history of nation-building since World War II, suggested that the U.S. needed nearly 500,000 soldiers to stabilize Iraq after the overthrow of Saddam Hussein's government. L. Paul Bremer, head of the Coalition Provisional Authority in Iraq, took the study to U.S. Secretary of Defense Donald Rumsfeld and President George W. Bush. Based on the study's conclusions, Bremer suggested that the United States military needed to reconsider downsizing its forces in Iraq and, on the contrary, increase them to help patrol cities and villages. But Bremer's memo was ignored.

Jones is the author of The Rise of European Security Cooperation (Cambridge University Press, 2007). He has published articles on U.S. foreign policy in The National Interest, Political Science Quarterly, Security Studies, the Chicago Journal of International Law, International Affairs, and Survival, as well as such newspapers and magazines as The New York Times, Newsweek, Financial Times, International Herald Tribune, and Chicago Tribune.

He was graduated from Bowdoin College in 1995, with High Honors in Government, Phi Beta Kappa, Summa Cum Laude. He received his MA (1999) and PhD (2004) from the University of Chicago.

Foreign Policy Views

On March 21, 2017, Seth G. Jones outlined an Afghanistan foreign policy strategy for the new Trump administration, in the article, “How Trump Should Manage Afghanistan: A Realistic Set of Goals for the New Administration.” (Jones) Jones describes that the current administration faces major issues in Afghanistan. The country is still a vital state in combating the war on terror. Jones discusses that the United States should have a realistic set of goals for Afghanistan. He states, “The United States should thus not expect the Afghan government to defeat the Taliban on the battlefield over the next four years of the administration. Instead, Washington should set a more realistic goal: to ensure that the Taliban doesn’t win. In order to do this, Washington could take several steps.” (Jones) Jones lays out two main areas the United States should focus on. First, the United States should continue to encourage for governance reform in the country. Past elections have been riddled with corruption. The United States has to push to make sure this does not happen. He also determined that the United States should encourage a “diplomatic reconciliation” with the Taliban. The next point Jones makes has to do with the amount of U.S. troops in Afghanistan. General Nicholson has requested, “several thousand additional troops.” (Jones) Jones concludes that this is a reasonable request.

Jones has suggested that large-scale counterinsurgency operations involving substantial military components are likely to decline, although the US will remain obliged to conduct counterinsurgency operations into the future.

Selected works

Books 

 Three Dangerous Men: Russia, China, Iran and the Rise of Irregular Warfare (W.W. Norton, 2021)
 A Covert Action: Reagan, the CIA, and the Cold War Struggle in Poland (W.W. Norton, 2018).
 Waging Insurgent Warfare (Oxford University Press, 2017).
 Hunting in the Shadows: The Pursuit of Al Qa’ida Since 9/11 (W.W. Norton, 2012).
 In the Graveyard of Empires: America's War in Afghanistan (W.W. Norton, 2009).
 How Terrorist Groups End: Lessons for Countering Al Qa'ida (RAND, 2008).
 Counterinsurgency in Afghanistan (RAND, 2008).
 The Rise of European Security Cooperation (Cambridge University Press, 2007).
 The Implications of Network-Centric Insurgencies on U.S. Army Operations (RAND, 2006).
 Securing Health: Lessons From Nation-Building Missions (RAND, 2006).
 Building a Successful Palestinian State: Security (RAND, 2006).
 Establishing Law and Order after Conflict (RAND, 2005).
 The UN’s Role in Nation-Building: From Congo to Iraq (RAND, 2005).
 Building a Successful Palestinian State (RAND, 2005).
 America’s Role in Nation-Building: From Germany to Japan  (RAND, 2003).
 Occupying Iraq: A History of the Coalition Provisional Authority  The RAND Corporation, 2009. By James Dobbins, Seth G. Jones, Benjamin Runkle, Sidd harth Mohandas.

Articles 

 “How Trump Should Manage Afghanistan: A Realistic Set of Goals for the New Administration,” Foreign Affairs, March 2017.
 “Cellphones in the Hindu Kush,” The National Interest, No. 96, July/August 2008. (with Bruce Hoffman)
 “The Rise of Afghanistan’s Insurgency,” International Security, Vol. 32, No. 4, Spring 2008.
 “Pakistan's Dangerous Game,” Survival, Vol. 49, No. 1, Spring 2007.
 “Fighting Networked Terror Groups: Lessons from Israel,” Studies in Conflict and Terrorism, Vol. 30, 2007.
 “The Rise of a European Defense,” Political Science Quarterly, Vol. 121, No. 2, Summer 2006.
 “Averting Failure in Afghanistan,” Survival, Vol. 48, No. 1, Spring 2006.
 “Arming Europe,” National Interest, No. 82, Winter 2005/2006. (with F. Stephen Larrabee)
 “The UN’s Record in Nation-Building,” Chicago Journal of International Law, Vol. 6, No. 2, Winter 2006. (with James Dobbins)
 “Measuring Power: How to Predict Future Balances,” Harvard International Review, Vol. 27, No. 2, Summer 2005.
 “Law and Order in Palestine,” Survival, Vol. 46, No. 4, Winter 2004-05. (with K. Jack Riley)
 “An Independent Palestine: The Security Dimension,” International Affairs, Vol. 80, No. 2, March 2004. (with Robert Hunter)
 “The European Union and the Security Dilemma,” Security Studies, Vol. 12, No. 3, Spring 2003.
 “Terrorism and the Battle for Homeland Security,” in Russell Howard, James Forest, Joanne Moore, eds., Homeland Security and Terrorism (New York: McGraw-Hill, 2006).
 “The Rise of a European Defense Industry,” US-Europe Analysis Series, Brookings Institution, May 2005.
 “A Dangerous Peace,” Newsweek, August 9, 2004.
 “Terrorism and the Battle for Homeland Security,” Foreign Policy Research Institute E-Note, May 21, 2004.

Notes

External links 
Seth G. Jones' profile at The RAND Corporation

1972 births
American political scientists
Walsh School of Foreign Service faculty
Living people
RAND Corporation people
University of Chicago alumni
Date of birth missing (living people)
Place of birth missing (living people)
New Great Game